Dale Martin Benkenstein (born 9 June 1974) is a former South African cricketer who was an all-rounder. He is currently first-team coach at Gloucestershire, having previously held the same role at Hampshire.

Early life
Benkenstein was born in Salisbury, Rhodesia (now Harare, Zimbabwe), the son of Martin Benkenstein, who had played for Rhodesia in the Currie Cup in the 1970s.  In 1980, around the time of Zimbabwean independence, Martin moved his family to Durban, South Africa.  There, Benkenstein attended Durban Preparatory High School, Durban High School and Michaelhouse schools.  He captained the SA Schools side in 1992, and led the SA Colts team to the West Indies in the same year.

Domestic career

Natal
Benkenstein made his debut at the age of 18 for Natal in the 1993/94 season, playing under the tutelage of Malcolm Marshall.  Marshall's analytical captaincy style made an impression on the young Benkenstein, who was later quoted as saying "In my eyes, he took the art of captaincy to another level." When Marshall left Natal at the end of the 1996 season, Benkenstein, still only 22, was selected to succeed him as captain.  While he got off to an unsteady start as captain, with Natal being heavily defeated by Border in his first game at the helm, he later recovered and led the team to win both the four-day and one-day domestic competitions.

Durham
When Benkenstein joined Durham for the 2005 season, he collected the club's player of the year award during his first attempt.  During this time he also filled in as skipper for the absent Mike Hussey and Paul Collingwood.  He went on to score 1,427 runs, which was a run scoring record at Durham until his mark was overtaken by Michael Di Venuto in 2009.

Dale has been quoted as to saying 2008 may be his last season in the sport as he wants to spend more time with his wife Jacqueline and children in Consett.

International career
Benkenstein had represented his country many times as a junior, including a stint as captain of the South African Schools side, and in the under-19 development team.  Benkenstein's senior ODI debut for South Africa came against England at Dhaka in 1998/99, when the teams were playing in the quarter-final of the Wills International Cup.  Despite some useful contributions, including 69 against the West Indies at Cape Town in 1998 and 3/5 against Kenya in the 2002/03 ICC Champions Trophy tournament, he never managed to establish himself as a permanent member of the team.  Benkenstein later admitted that he had not taken full advantage of the opportunities that came his way at the international level.

Coaching career 
Benkenstein was named coach of Hampshire in February 2014, having worked as a batting coach for the South African side Dolphins. He left his coaching role at Hampshire in July 2016 due to family reasons. After returning to South Africa he became head coach at Hilton College where he worked with 2019 Hilton head boy, and future Hampshire County Cricket Club bowler, John Turner.

In May 2021, Benkenstein joined Lancashire as batting coach on a short-term contract. In November 2021 he was named head coach of Gloucestershire on a three-year contract.

Awards
Benkenstein was named one of the Wisden Cricketers of the Year in 2009, based on his work with Durham in the English county championship.

Style
Benkenstein was a right-handed batsman, and a right-arm off-break or right-arm medium pace bowler.

Career best performances
Updated 19 July 2011

References

External links
 

Afrikaner people
White Rhodesian people
Zimbabwean emigrants to South Africa
South African cricketers
Alumni of Michaelhouse
Alumni of Highbury Preparatory School
1974 births
Living people
South Africa One Day International cricketers
KwaZulu-Natal cricketers
Dolphins cricketers
Durham cricketers
Durham cricket captains
Cricketers at the 1998 Commonwealth Games
Commonwealth Games gold medallists for South Africa
Delhi Giants cricketers
Wisden Cricketers of the Year
Cricketers from Harare
Marylebone Cricket Club cricketers
South African cricket coaches
Commonwealth Games medallists in cricket
Medallists at the 1998 Commonwealth Games